Zumbo is an Italian surname. Notable people with the surname include:

Adriano Zumbo (born 1981), Australian chef
Bruno Zumbo, Canadian Professor, Mathematician, Measurement, Psychometrics
Gaetano Giulio Zumbo (1656–1701), Italian sculptor
Jim Zumbo, American hunter

Italian-language surnames